The Lands Tribunal is a tribunal in Hong Kong that deals with legal disputes over land. It was established by the Lands Tribunal Ordinance (Cap. 17). It is situated in the former Kowloon Magistracy building.

Disputes not resolved at this level are taken to the Court of Appeal.

Composition 

The Lands Tribunal consists of professional judges: a President (who is a Judge of the Court of First Instance of the High Court) and Presiding Officers (who are District Judges or Deputy District Judges). In addition, there are Members of the Tribunal who are qualified surveyors.

The President and a Presiding Officer may either sit alone or together with a Member in hearing cases. A Member may also sit alone in hearing cases.

The composition of the Lands Tribunal  was:

President
 Madam Justice Lisa Wong Kwok-ying

Presiding Officers
 His Honour Judge Michael Wong Yat-ming
 His Honour Judge Jonathan Wong
 Deputy District Judge Lee Siu-ho

Members
 Lawrence Pang Ho-chuen
 Alex Ng Siu-lam

References

External links 
 Official homepage

Judiciary of Hong Kong